Deulgaon, commonly known as Deulgaon Awachar, is a village located in Manwat taluka of Parbhani district, in the state of Maharashtra, India.

Demographics
As per 2011 census:
Deulgaon Awachar has 524 families residing. The village has population of 2241.
Out of the population of 2241, 1139 are males while 1102 are females.
Literacy rate of the village is 69.50%.
Average sex ratio of the village is 968 females to 1000 males. Average sex ratio of Maharashtra state is 929.

References

Villages in Parbhani district